The 2016–17 Ligue 1 was the 52nd season of top-tier football in Senegal and the ninth professional season. The season began on 4 November 2016. Gorée are the defending champions.

Génération Foot, a club based in Sangalkam in the east of Metropolitan Dakar (aka the Dakar Urban Area) won their only national championship title for the season and set a new club record of 52 goals and 57 points and will be appearing in the 2018 CAF Champions League in the following season.  Overall it is unbeatable to ASC Diaraf's 54 goals scored in a season and their 72 points made in 2003–04 season, Génération Foot's records are one of the highest in Senegalese top flight football competition, but the highest in the professional Ligue 1. Niane was the best scorer for the season scoring a record number of 19 goals. Last two positions were ASC Linguère and US Gorée who was last year's champion, Gorée was relegated. Due to the Demba Diop stadium crush which occurred on 15 June which was not in the Premier League, US Ouakam was demoted from Ligue 1 and ASC Linguère was relieved from their relegation.

The league comprised 14 teams, with the bottom two relegated to the 2018 Ligue 2.

Teams
A total of 14 teams will contest the league, including 12 sides from the 2015–16 season and two promoted from the 2015–16 Ligue 2, Génération Foot and Teungueth.

On the other hand, ASC Suneor and Olympique Ngor were the last two teams of the 2015–16 season and are playing in Ligue 2 for the 2016-17 season. Gorée are the defending champions from the 2015–16 season.

Stadiums and locations

League table

Positions by round

See also
2016–17 in Senegalese football

References

Senegal Premier League seasons
Senegal
1